South Chennai is the new southern neighbourhoods of Chennai city, India. It is roughly the neighbourhoods and suburbs that lie south of the Adyar River. None of these places were part of Chennai Corporation before 1947 and became part of Chennai before 1990 when they existed as separate local bodies. 

South Chennai has two notified reserve forests and has a rich human history indicated by the presence of many palaeolithic, neolithic and megalithic remains. The South Chennai zone, with its head office at Guindy division comprises Guindy, Mylapore, Velachery, Tambaram, Alandur and Sholinganallur taluks.

References 
 

Geography of Chennai